Bani Jabr is a sub-district located in Attyal District, Sana'a Governorate, Yemen. Bani Jabr had a population of 10818 according to the 2004 census.

References 

Sub-districts in Attyal District